Sinovenatorinae is a subfamily of the extinct bird-like troodontid dinosaurs known exclusively from the Early Cretaceous of China. It includes the genus Sinovenator as well as several related genera.

References

Troodontids
Early Cretaceous dinosaurs of Asia
Prehistoric animal subfamilies
Tetrapod subfamilies
Prehistoric animals of China
Taxa named by Stephen L. Brusatte
Taxa named by Lü Junchang